Alexandros Zeris (born 26 February 1994) is a Greek professional footballer who plays as a right back for Super League 2 club Panserraikos.

Career
Born in Volos, Zeris began his career at the youth academies of Niki Volos.  In 2010, he transferred to Olympiacos Volos.  In 2011, he transferred to Panetolikos, but made no appearances with the team and went on loan to Pyrasos.  In July 2013, he signed a three-year contract with  Olympiakos Volos. In August 2015, he signed a three-year contract with AEL. A year later, on 6 August 2016, Zeris left the club by mutual agreement.

In mid-August 2019, Zeris joined Panserraikos on a free agent.

Honours
Volos
Gamma Ethniki: 2017–18

References

1994 births
Living people
Greek footballers
Olympiacos Volos F.C. players
Panetolikos F.C. players
Athlitiki Enosi Larissa F.C. players
AO Chania F.C. players
Volos N.F.C. players
Kavala F.C. players
Panserraikos F.C. players
Super League Greece 2 players
Association football defenders
Footballers from Volos